The Bridge in Shaler Township, which carries Burchfield Road over Pine Creek, is a single span stone arch bridge in Allegheny County, Pennsylvania built in 1915. The bridge is a high quality ashlar construction with the single span covering 63 feet. Stone arch bridges are rare in western Pennsylvania.

The bridge was added to the National Register of Historic Places on June 22, 1988.

References

Road bridges on the National Register of Historic Places in Pennsylvania
Bridges completed in 1915
Bridges in Allegheny County, Pennsylvania
National Register of Historic Places in Allegheny County, Pennsylvania
Stone arch bridges in the United States